Jean-Claude Romand (born 11 February 1954) is a French spree killer and impostor who pretended to be a medical doctor for 18 years before killing his wife, children and parents in January 1993 when he was about to be exposed.

Heavy suspicions also weigh around the death of his father-in-law, Pierre Crolet, who fell from a staircase on 23 October 1988. Jean-Claude Romand is also the only witness to "the accident".

Biography 

Jean-Claude Romand was born on 11 February 1954 in Lons-le-Saunier and grew up in the village Clairvaux-les-Lacs in the département of Jura. He studied at the lycée of Lons-le-Saunier until his baccalauréat. In 1971 he registered at the classes préparatoires of Lycée du Parc in Lyon but dropped out after one term. Afterwards he enrolled as a medical student.

Romand told friends and family that he had passed the first and second year medical examinations in 1975, when in fact he had purposely avoided taking either. He never qualified as a doctor, which was unknown by his parents.

For 18 years, Romand posed as a successful medical professional and researcher in the World Health Organization (WHO). He claimed that he had researched arteriosclerosis and that he had contact with political figures.

In reality, he spent his days wandering and used the free information services of the local WHO building. He lived close by in Prévessin-Moëns, France. Periodically, he left for a supposed work trip but travelled only as far as Geneva International Airport and spent a couple of days in a hotel room there, studying medical journals and a travel guide about the various countries he lied about visiting. Romand lived off the money his wife and he had made by selling an apartment, from his wife's salary and from money given to him by various relatives, who were told that he was investing it in various hedge funds and foreign ventures.

Jean-Claude Romand is the only witness to the death of his father-in-law, Pierre Crolet, on 23 October 1988. Pierre Crolet had a fatal fall on the stairs of his house a few days after asking for reimbursement of part of his financial investment. When the rescuers arrived on the scene they claimed to have heard him stammer: "Jean-Claude m'a, Jean-Claude m'a..." ("Jean-Claude [missing verb]d me") before Jean-Claude intervened to put an oxygen mask on the face of his father-in-law. Pierre Crolet died of his injuries a few days later without waking up. The courts ruled it an accident and Romand was not prosecuted, later organizing his father-in-law’s funeral and launching a fundraiser. He subsequently diverted all donations.

Actions on the night of the murder 
On 9 January 1993, Romand withdrew 2,000 francs and borrowed a .22 rifle from his father, for which he purchased a suppressor and gas canisters and asked for them to be gift wrapped. That night, according to authorities, he beat his wife to death on the couple's double bed with a rolling pin. He left her body until the morning, sleeping as normal. The next morning he woke his children, had breakfast and watched cartoons with them. He put them to bed that night, and, once they had fallen asleep, he shot them both in the head. After these killings, the only people who could expose him were his parents and his ex-mistress, who wanted back 900,000 francs that she had given him as a favour.

The next morning Romand travelled to his parents' house, where he joined them for a meal. Immediately after the meal he repeatedly shot both of them and the family dog.

That night he picked up his ex-mistress, telling her they were invited to a dinner with the then-health minister, Bernard Kouchner. Pretending that they were lost, he made her get out of the car and attempted to strangle her with a cord, spraying tear gas into her face. When she fought back, he apologized and drove her back to her home, after making her promise never to tell anyone about his attempt to murder her. He then returned to his family home, which still contained the bodies of his dead wife, children and dog.

He sat and watched television before he poured petrol around the house, set it on fire and took an overdose of sleeping pills. Whether this attempt was genuine is doubtful, since some writers have pointed out that the pills he took were long expired and he had access to more effective barbiturates. He was rescued by local firefighters, who were alerted by the road cleaners at 4 o’clock the next morning.

He survived the blaze but refused to talk to police during subsequent questioning.

Aftermath
Romand's trial for the murder of his family began on 25 June 1996. On 6 July 1996, Romand was found guilty and sentenced to life imprisonment with no possibility of parole for 22 years; he became eligible for parole in 2015. An appeals court in Bourges granted Romand parole in 2019; he had been imprisoned for 26 years. He was released into the custody of a nearby Benedictine monastery and had an electronic bracelet placed on him to ensure he did not try to escape. Romand is reputed to suffer from narcissistic personality disorder.

Documentary, fiction and scholarship 

French author Emmanuel Carrère corresponded with Romand during his imprisonment and wrote a book, L'Adversaire (The Adversary), based on the case. Nicole Garcia directed a movie, L'Adversaire (2002), based on the book; actor Daniel Auteuil played the part of Romand (renamed Jean-Marc Faure in the film). 

Two other films were loosely based on Romand's life: the French L'Emploi du temps (2001) (English title: Time Out) and the Spanish  (English title: Nobody's Life). 

Romand's deception also formed the basis of the 'Subterraneans' episode of the BBC crime drama Waking The Dead (third episode of the fifth series in 2005). Episode 16 (season 1) 'Phantom' of Law & Order: Criminal Intent is also constructed around this story.

Philosopher Jean Baudrillard analyzed Romand's case in his book of essays The Intelligence of Evil or the Lucidity Pact. He describes Romand's secret life not as a dissimulation but as a genuine doubling: "To transfigure insignificance and banality, all that is needed is to turn them into a parallel universe. There is no simulation in all this." He also claims that such a long pretense would be impossible without some kind of complicity: "One can no more explain the silence of those around him than Romand's own silence. The deeper he gets into his stratagem, the deeper the others retreat into their absence of curiosity. It is genuinely a conspiracy."

References 

 The Man Who Faked His Life, Channel 4 Documentary, 2005, director and producer Liz Tucker 

1954 births
Living people
People from Lons-le-Saunier
Impostors
French spree killers
French murderers of children
Familicides
French prisoners sentenced to life imprisonment
Prisoners sentenced to life imprisonment by France
People convicted of murder by France
French people convicted of murder
People with narcissistic personality disorder